The December 15–17, 2020 nor'easter was a powerful nor'easter that hammered the Northeastern United States and produced widespread swaths of over  of snow in much of the region from December 15–17, 2020, ending a 1,000+ day high-impact snowstorm drought in much of the Mid-Atlantic and coastal New England regions. The system developed out of a weak area of low-pressure that first developed over the Central United States producing some snowfall before moving eastward, and by December 16, a new, dominant area of low pressure began to develop along the Southeast coast. This low steadily deepened as it moved along and impacted the Mid-Atlantic coastline, prompting several winter-related advisories and warnings for much of the Northeast.

Multiple states that were expected to be impacted by the nor'easter, including New Jersey, Pennsylvania, and Virginia declared states of emergencies on December 15–16 in advance of the storm. New York and Boston declared a snow emergency the day of the storm as well. The nor'easter brought significant snowfall to metropolitan areas such as New York City, Philadelphia, and Washington, D.C., which eclipsed the entire snowfall total from the previous winter season, as well as Boston and Portland that saw over a foot of snow from the storm. Tens of thousands lost power during the storm, and the storm caused high wind gusts along the Jersey Shore, in addition to rough surf and even storm surge in coastal Massachusetts. At least 7 people have been confirmed killed as a result from the storm, and it is estimated to have caused over $125 million (2021 USD) in damages. The winter storm was rated Category 2 winter storm on the Regional Snowfall Index (RSI) scale, the first such storm for the Northeastern United States since a nor'easter in March 2018. The system was unofficially named Winter Storm Gail by The Weather Channel.

Meteorological history 

The nor'easter originated from a disorganized winter storm in the Southern Plains of the United States, late on December 14. The winter storm became more widespread the next day, as a low-pressure system developed, and it began to spread snowfall in Oklahoma and Kansas. The system slowly moved eastward across the Southern Plains throughout the day on December 15. On the next day, the system reached the Eastern United States and began spreading snow, ice, and rain across the region. Early on December 17, the system then moved off the coast and developed strong winds and heavier precipitation, while the snowfall spread northward. As the low-pressure system began to strengthen, the rain-snow line pushed northward as well. The nor'easter also developed an eye-like feature around this time. A combination of moisture from the tropical eastern Pacific and the Gulf of Mexico, very strong low- to mid-level warm air advection, and strong frontogenesis led to strong mesoscale banding, which resulted in heavy snowfall rates for several hours over parts of the Northeastern United States. The nor'easter developed a secondary low to the east later that day and gradually began to weaken, as it began moving away from the Northeastern U.S. A high-pressure system to the east of Atlantic Canada then steered the nor'easter away from the coast, after it passed south of New England, and the storm raced off eastward into the Atlantic. For the next couple of days, the nor'easter continued moving eastward, before the original low was absorbed into the developing secondary low to the east, on December 20. This new storm subsequently strengthened, and the system was named Greta by the Free University of Berlin on the same day.

Preparations 

On December 14, Winter Storm Watches were placed into effect in a large swath from Virginia up through southern New England. Early the next day, watches located from Virginia to Western New Jersey were updated to Winter Storm Warnings. Simultaneously, Winter Weather Advisories were issued for the southern end of the storm. Later winter storm warnings were issued up through most of southern New England.

Mid-Atlantic states
On December 16, Governor Ralph Northam of Virginia declared a state of emergency.

300 snow plows were deployed to apply salt to many major roads and bridges due to expected snowfall.

On December 15, Governor Tom Wolf declared a state of emergency for Pennsylvania. 100 pieces of equipment to treat roads were also deployed at the beginning of the storm. In Philadelphia, classes that were already in virtual learning due to COVID-19 were instructed to continue with classes December 17.

On December 16, the Governor of New Jersey, Phil Murphy, declared a state of emergency. NJ Transit suspended bus and train travel beginning at 6:30 p.m. EST as a result of the degrading conditions. The state also imposed travel restrictions across several interstates, including Interstates 78, 80 and 280.

In New York City, mayor Bill de Blasio announced that schools in the city would transition to online learning for the day of December 17, citing the snow. Governor Andrew Cuomo declared states of emergency in 18 counties, all upstate.

New England
Connecticut Governor Ned Lamont ordered all large trucks off the state's highways beginning at 9:00 PM EST on December 16. The truck ban was lifted at 9:00 AM on December 18. The Connecticut Department of Transportation mobilized hundreds of snowplows to keep the state's roads open during the storm.

Massachusetts Governor Charlie Baker urged residents in his state to stay at home during the nor'easter. The Massachusetts Department of Transportation fully deployed its resources to clear the roads, including 3,800 pieces of snow-fighting equipment to be used on some 15,000 miles of roads. The Massachusetts Emergency Management Agency's emergency operations center was activated. Boston Mayor Marty Walsh declared a snow emergency in the city ahead of the storm. A parking ban was implemented and all school buildings were closed on December 16. City departments and some COVID-19 testing sites were also closed as a result of the storm.

Impact

Due to icy conditions on the roadways as well as heavy snow and sleet, the distribution of the COVID-19 vaccine became more difficult.

United States

Southeast
Severe weather from the warm sector of the storm was reported near Tampa Bay in Florida. Tornado warnings were issued in Hillsborough County and Pinellas County, Florida. A large and damaging tornado was confirmed in Pinellas County, though no causalties were reported. However, tornadoes resulted in $16.28 million in damage.

Confirmed tornadoes

Mid-Atlantic states

Virginia State Police responded to about 200 crashes and 125 disabled vehicles across the state. By 6:45 p.m. local time, Dominion Energy reported nearly 20,000 power outages, mainly across the Shenandoah Valley, western Piedmont. Appalachian Power reported roughly 3,000 outages in southwestern Virginia, and more than 6,800 customers were without power in the Rappahannock Electric Cooperative area. The National Weather Service received a report of up to six-tenths of an inch of freezing rain east of Galax and a half-inch in western Bedford County.

Maryland State Police responded to 489 service calls on December 16 between 9 a.m. and 3 p.m. local time, including 161 crashes and 60 abandoned or disabled vehicles. The Baltimore Police Department responded to 88 calls for accidents around the city Wednesday since 12:00 p.m. local time. On the morning of December 17, Spirit Airlines Flight 696 skidded off the taxiway after landing at Baltimore-Washington Thurgood Marshall Airport due to snow and ice accumulations.

By late December 16, power outages peaked around 14,000 in New Jersey, before decreasing by the following morning. At times, snowfall rates within the state averaged  an hour, particularly in the northern portion.  of snow was recorded at Newark.

In Philadelphia, Pennsylvania, the city recorded  of snow, the highest since 2018 and more than the entirety of the previous winter season. The Pittsburgh area got 9.3 inches, the most since the 2010 storm. North of there got over a foot of snow. The snowstorm caused a pickup truck to crash into an EMS truck in Collier TWP PA, in the Pittsburgh area. The crew cleared before the truck hit, according to footage. Two people in Clinton County were killed in a multi-dozen car pileup on Interstate 80.

A travel ban was issued in Broome County, New York. Albany saw  of snow. One fatality occurred in the area along Interstate 787 when a tractor-trailer crashed into a snowplow. Ice accumulations of up to half an inch occurred in the Hudson Valley, and up to two-tenths of an inch of ice accumulated on Long Island. State police responded to more than 600 accidents and disabled vehicles overnight stuck in snow and sleet as the storm passed over, resulting in two fatal accidents. The sleet made the cleanup efforts particularly difficult on Long Island, due to its weight. The snowfall totals from this storm in New York City were greater than the snow total from the previous winter, which was just  of snowfall. Newark Valley saw  of snow, the maximum snowfall accumulation during the event.

New England

Snow totals ranged between 6 inches along coastal southeastern Connecticut to over a foot over interior sections of central and eastern Connecticut.

The greatest snowfall total in Massachusetts was in the town of Florida, where  of snow were recorded. Snowfall totals of at least  were recorded in most of the state, with the exception of Cape Cod. The heaviest snowfall was in the northwestern portion of Massachusetts. Boston set a record one-day snowfall accumulation on December 17, where  of snow was recorded from the nor'easter. Near-blizzard conditions were reported across areas of Massachusetts.

Atlantic Canada

Nova Scotia
On December 17–18, as the nor'easter passed to the south of the province, winter weather caused various delays and closures, particularly in the Provincial capital, Halifax, where schools, government offices, recreational programs and public parks had delayed openings after  of snow fell. In Annapolis county and the South Shore, the snow was disruptive enough to close schools for the day. A bus in Laurencetown drove off the road, although the student aboard and driver weren't injured. Many parents were worried about their children's safety, preferring they stay home for the day. According to local police, traffic was lighter than usual and very few collisions were reported as residents took the storm seriously.

Snowfall totals

See also

December 2009 North American blizzard
December 2010 North American blizzard
December 17–22, 2012 North American blizzard
March 2014 nor'easter
January 2016 United States blizzard
February 2021 nor'easter

Notes

References

External links

 2020 Storm Summaries from the Weather Prediction Center

Nor'easters
2020–21 North American winter
F2 tornadoes
2020 in New Jersey
2020 in Pennsylvania
2020 in New York (state)
2020 in Massachusetts
Natural disasters in the United States
2020 meteorology
Ice storms
Extratropical cyclones
2020 natural disasters in the United States